Hobart Kelliston McDowell III was an American business attorney, government affairs consultant and politician. He was mayor of El Segundo, California for six years (2004–2010), and served as a member of the city council for twelve years (1998–2010).

McDowell opposed expansion of LAX, threatening to sue the Los Angeles City Council. He reached a deal with Los Angeles to develop an alternative to expansion in return for dropping the lawsuit. He also threatened to sue over a plan by the Metropolitan Transportation Authority to put a rail yard in El Segundo.  He also fought to keep the Los Angeles Air Force Base open.

Personal
Hobart Kelliston McDowell III was the son of the late Hobart K. McDowell Jr., and the late Martha Louise Shea McDowell. He had a sister, Tina S. McDowell, and two brothers, Joseph S. McDowell and Robert M. McDowell. He had one son, Kelliston.

References

Further reading

1950s births
People from Vienna, Virginia
Deerfield Academy alumni
Stanford University alumni
UCLA School of Law alumni
California lawyers
Mayors of places in California
People from El Segundo, California
2017 deaths
20th-century American lawyers